Thida Oo (also spelt Thidar Oo; born 27 November 1964 in Rangoon, Burma) is the incumbent Minister of Legal Affairs and Union Attorney-General of Myanmar. She was appointed by the Burmese military on 2 February 2021. Before accepting the appointment, she served as the Office of the Attorney-General's permanent secretary.

Personal life 
Thida Oo has one son, Min Ye Myat Phone Khine, a medical doctor in Australia.

Sanctions 
On 31 January 2022, the U.S. Department of the Treasury added Thida Oo to its Specially Designated Nationals (SDN) list. The UK and Canada joined the U.S in the sanctions against Oo, in a "coordinated action against Myanmar military regime, targeting individuals responsible for undermining democracy and rule of law".

References

21st-century Burmese lawyers
Attorneys general of Burma
Government ministers of Myanmar
Living people
1964 births
Specially Designated Nationals and Blocked Persons List
Individuals related to Myanmar sanctions